Michał Koj (born 28 July 1993) is a Polish professional footballer who plays as a centre-back for I liga club Puszcza Niepołomice.

Career

At the age of 16, Koj joined the youth academy of Panathinaikos.

References

External links
 
 

1993 births
Living people
Association football defenders
Polish footballers
Ekstraklasa players
I liga players
III liga players
Pogoń Szczecin players
Panathinaikos F.C. players
Ruch Chorzów players
Górnik Zabrze players
Korona Kielce players
Puszcza Niepołomice players
Sportspeople from Ruda Śląska